Wuxu is a town in Dingyuan County, Anhui. , it administers one residential community and the following twenty villages:
Wuxu Village
Beiji Village
Xikong Village
Gengxiang Village
Dawei Village
Chenji Village
Shangli Village
Zhangang Village
Guantang Village
Nanzhou Village
Qigang Village
Yanshou Village
Dahu Village
Xuangang Village
Shanliu Village
Jiuzi Village
Gaogeng Village
Yangqiao Village
Damu Village
Yongxing Village

References

Dingyuan County
Township-level divisions of Anhui